Aliotta Haynes Jeremiah was an American rock group from the 1970s.

The preceding incarnation was named Aliotta Haynes, a trio composed of bassist Mitch Aliotta, drummer Ted Aliotta, and guitarist Skip Haynes. Ted departed after their debut album, Aliotta Haynes Music (1970), and was replaced by keyboardist John Jeremiah. As Aliotta Haynes Jeremiah, their 1971 eponymous album was their last for the Ampex label.

The band scored a popular regional hit in the Chicago, Illinois area in 1972 with the title track of their follow-up 1973 album, Lake Shore Drive, a tribute to the lakefront highway in Chicago.

The initials "LSD" are occasionally used in Chicago vernacular to refer to the highway (although it is sometimes referred to as the Outer Drive to distinguish it from Inner Lake Shore Drive, which extends from Ohio St. to E. La Salle St.). Elsewhere, LSD is better known as the initials of the name of a hallucinogenic drug. Skip Haynes claims "Lake Shore Drive" has no drug references whatsoever, unlike "The Snow Queen," which referenced the up and downsides of cocaine usage.

The 1992 Quicksilver CD compilation Lake Shore Drive was missing two songs from the original 1973 Big Foot LP, "Leaving Chicago A.M.F." and "Long Time Gone" (medley with "When I Was a Cowboy"), but contained the title track of 1977's Slippin' Away plus newer material. Lake Shore Drive was re-released on compact disc in 1996 for its 25th anniversary on a double-CD set, along with some of the band's other songs. 

The band appeared in a 1978 made-for-TV movie, Sparrow, playing a rock band whose lead singer is electrocuted while performing onstage.

"Lake Shore Drive" was featured in the soundtrack of the 2017 movie Guardians of the Galaxy Vol. 2.

Deaths
 Aliotta Haynes Jeremiah's former keyboardist, John Jeremiah, died on December 5, 2011, in Chester, Illinois.
 Mitchell A. Aliotta, of Aliotta Haynes Jeremiah and Rotary Connection, died on July 21, 2015, at the age of 71.
 Skip Haynes died on October 2, 2017.

As of 2021, Ted Aliotta is the only living band member.

Discography
Aliotta Haynes Music (LP) (Ampex 10108) 1970
Aliotta Haynes Jeremiah (LP) (Ampex 10119) 1971
Lake Shore Drive (LP) (Big Foot 714) 1973
Slippin' Away (LP) (Little Foot 711) 1977
Lake Shore Drive (CD) (Quicksilver QSCD-1019) 1992
Songs (CD) (Quicksilver QSCD-1025) 1994
Lake Shore Drive at 25 (2-CDs) (Quicksilver QSCD-1033) 1996
Bob Stroud's Classic Rock Roots Vol. II (SRO Productions) 1999

References

Musical groups from Illinois
Musical groups from Chicago